Yellow Hell (Italian: Inferno giallo) is a 1942 Italian drama film directed by Géza von Radványi and starring Fosco Giachetti, Maria von Tasnady and Pál Jávor. A Doctor working in the tropics falls in love with another man's wife, but is killed in a native uprising before he can confess his feelings to her.

It was shot at the Cinecitta Studios in Rome.

Cast
 Fosco Giachetti as Francesco 
 Maria von Tasnady as Maria 
 Pál Jávor as Pietro 
 Petr Sharov as Il vecchio Dimitri
 Otello Toso as Giorgio
 Jone Salinas as La fanciulla indigena 
 Lia Corelli
 Harry Feist

References

Bibliography
 Gundle, Stephen. Mussolini's Dream Factory: Film Stardom in Fascist Italy. Berghahn Books, 2013.

External links

1942 films
1940s Italian-language films
1942 drama films
Italian black-and-white films
Films directed by Géza von Radványi
Films shot at Cinecittà Studios
1940s Italian films